Piyush Tanwar (born 8 October 1991) is an Indian cricketer. He made his Twenty20 debut for Gujarat in the 2018–19 Syed Mushtaq Ali Trophy on 27 February 2019.

References

External links
 

1991 births
Living people
Indian cricketers
Gujarat cricketers
Place of birth missing (living people)